Steele Creek is a stream in the U.S. state of Tennessee.

Steele Creek has the name of a pioneer settler. A variant name was Steeles Creek.

References

Rivers of Hardin County, Tennessee
Rivers of Tennessee